Slobodskoy (masculine), Slobodskaya (feminine), or Slobodskoye (neuter) is the name of several inhabited localities in Russia.

Urban localities
Slobodskoy, Kirov Oblast, a town in Kirov Oblast

Rural localities
Slobodskoy, Arkhangelsk Oblast, a settlement in Kharitonovsky Selsoviet of Kotlassky District of Arkhangelsk Oblast
Slobodskoy, Bryansk Oblast, a settlement in Trosnyansky Selsoviet of Zhukovsky District of Bryansk Oblast
Slobodskoy, Oryol Oblast, a khutor in Koroskovsky Selsoviet of Kromskoy District of Oryol Oblast
Slobodskoy, Rostov Oblast, a khutor in Susatskoye Rural Settlement of Semikarakorsky District of Rostov Oblast
Slobodskoye, Kostroma Oblast, a village in Kuzeminskoye Settlement of Soligalichsky District of Kostroma Oblast
Slobodskoye, Bor, Nizhny Novgorod Oblast, a village in Lindovsky Selsoviet of the city of oblast significance of Bor, Nizhny Novgorod Oblast
Slobodskoye, Kstovsky District, Nizhny Novgorod Oblast, a selo in Slobodskoy Selsoviet of Kstovsky District of Nizhny Novgorod Oblast
Slobodskoye, Tula Oblast, a selo in Shilovsky Rural Okrug of Yefremovsky District of Tula Oblast
Slobodskaya, a village in Shabanovsky Rural Okrug of Omutinsky District of Tyumen Oblast